Lissie Saggiak, also known as Lizzie Saggiak, (1924-1989) was an Inuit artist. Saggiak was born in Salluit, Quebec. She is known for her drawings and sculptures.

Her work is included in the collections of the National Gallery of Canada, the Winnipeg Art Gallery and the McMichael Canadian Art Collection.

References

1924 births
1989 deaths
20th-century Canadian artists
20th-century Canadian women artists
Inuit artists
Artists from Quebec
Canadian women sculptors
20th-century Canadian sculptors